Sasmuan, officially the Municipality of Sasmuan, formerly known by its Spanish name Sexmoán, is a 4th class municipality in the province of Pampanga, Philippines. According to the 2020 census, it has a population of 29,076 people.

Etymology
It was known as Sexmoan until January 15, 1991. The town's former name in Spanish was Sexmoán, as was initially transcribed by Spanish friars. In Spanish, the letter <x> used to be pronounced as a voiceless postalveolar fricative /ʃ/, identical to the digraph <sh> in English. It was derived from the ancient Kapampangan rootword sasmo, which means to meet, according to a 17th-century Kapampangan dictionary. Sasmuan therefore is synonymous with "pitagmuan" or "meeting place of the datus" or "meeting point".  It was named "Sasmuan" because it is where the Pampangos meet when they were at war with the Chinese in Guagua. In 1991, it was unanimously changed into Sasmuan, since the previous name, Sexmoán, denoted a very negative sexual connotation not only to the town, but also to the people living within the town itself due to the inculture of believing that the prefix "Sex-" had something to do with the English word sex.

History
Sasmuan already had a well-developed system of government well before the era of Spanish colonization. It evolved to be one of the oldest and major settlements in Pampanga by the 16th century. The Santa Lucia Church was one of the first Roman Catholic churches built in the Philippines by the Spaniards with the political and financial support of the Principalia.

Geography
Sasmuan is located in the southern part of Pampanga. It is one of the three towns in the province along the Manila Bay coastline (Others are Macabebe and Lubao). It is bounded to the north by the municipalities of Guagua and Minalin; to the east by the municipality of Macabebe; to the west by the municipality of Lubao; and to the south by Manila Bay. Most of the town's area is fish ponds.

Barangays
Sasmuan is politically subdivided into 12 barangays.
 Santo Tomas includes Sitio Santa Cruz
 San Nicolas 2nd includes Sitio Remedios (Dakung)
 San Nicolas 1st 
 Santa Lucia 
 San Antonio 
 San Pedro
 Santa Monica includes Sitio San Francisco (Cutud)
 Malusac "Sto Rosario"
 Sebitanan "Sto Cristo"
 Mabuanbuan "Sagrada Pamilya"
 Batang 1st "San Vicente"
 Batang 2nd "Sto. Nino"

Climate

Demographics

Economy 

Sasmuan has a unique geography in that it is surrounded by fish ponds. Aquaculture has been the main industry that drives the local economy. The fish from ponds and other areas are sold at the Fish Port.

The town has 2 prime business ventures and both are in the food industry. These two are Sasmuan Delicacies which was founded in 1990 and Aiza's Sweets which was started in 2000. For Sasmuan Delicacies, their products are being sold in many big supermarkets and malls in the Philippines, including SM City Malls. Aiza's Sweets on the other hand, has SM City Malls as one of their primary customer, but they also sell to several popular local shops such as Susie's Sweets, Nathaniels, etc. Also, Aiza's Sweets exports to the United States and Canada.

Culture

Cuisine
 Polvoron- Roasted flour with sugar, milk, and butter or margarine.
 Tamales- Rice flour with shrimp gravy, garlic, and a little slice of boiled egg steamed in banana leaves.
 Palapat- A sour fruit from a tree that grows in shallow waters. Often utilised as a condiment.
 Tabang Talangka- fat derived from talangka, a small breed of crab.
 Eko- a type of fish sauce.
 Taklang Dagis - A Stool from Dakung.
 Dulum/Sinarapan- A small fish found in rivers.
 Pituklip- Thin sticky rice dessert.

Fiestas
 Fiesta San Juan: Celebrated every June 24 in honour of St. John the Baptist. Customarily, visitors to the town are doused with water in imitation of the saint's biblical role. A grand fluvial parade is conducted that lasts throughout the day.
 Kuraldal Festival: Celebrated every January 6 in honour of the town's patron saint, Saint Lucy. This saint is believed to help not only the blind but women who wish to have fertility and to bear children.

Santa Lucia Parish Church

The Santa Lucia Parish Church in Sasmuan is the first church in the province built by Augustinian priests. It stands right beside the Río Grande, a river that connects Pampanga to Manila Bay. The structure is said to have been built by Jose Duque in the 17th century, was rebuilt in the early 1800s, and was reinforced by Toribio Fanjul in 1884.

The edifice has decorative floral carvings on its main entrance. The old town church is one of the few, if not the only church in the country where the single belfry is situated between the church and the convento. Devotees from all over the province flock here to honor Saint Lucy, believed to be a miraculous saint.

Founded in 1590, Santa Lucia is a parish of the Vicariate of St. Joseph in the Archdiocese of San Fernando. The parish celebrates the feast day of its titular patron on December 13.

Gallery

See also
List of renamed cities and municipalities in the Philippines
Place names considered unusual

References

External links

Sasmuan Profile at PhilAtlas.com
[ Philippine Standard Geographic Code]
Philippine Census Information
Local Governance Performance Management System

Municipalities of Pampanga
Populated places on Manila Bay